Sušica or Sushitsa (Cyrillic: Сушица) may refer to several places:

Populated places

Bulgaria 
Sushitsa, Blagoevgrad Province, a village in southwestern Bulgaria
Sushitsa, Kyustendil Province, a village in southwestern Bulgaria
Sushitsa, Veliko Tarnovo Province, a village in north central Bulgaria
Sushitsa, Karlovo, a neighbourhood of Karlovo, south central Bulgaria
Gorna Sushitsa, a village in southwestern Bulgaria
Zlatolist, Blagoevgrad Province, formerly Dolna Sushitsa, the former name of a village in southwestern Bulgaria

Romania 
Şuşiţa, Brezniţa Ocol, Mehedinţi, a village in Romania

North Macedonia 
Sušica, Novo Selo

Slovenia 
Sušica, Ivančna Gorica, a village near Ivančna Gorica

Serbia 
Sušica (Kruševac), a village near Kruševac
Sušica (Sjenica), a village near Sjenica
Sušica (Valjevo), a village near Valjevo

Croatia 
Sušica (Otok Ugljan), a village near Ugljan

Rivers

Sušica River (Bosnia and Herzegovina), left tributary of the Trebišnjica, Bosnia and Herzegovina
Sušica River (Montenegro), a river on mountain Durmitor, Montenegro
Sušica River (Serbia), right tributary of the Đetinja, Serbia
Sušica River (Slovenia), a river near Dolenjske Toplice, Slovenia